Mykola Musiyenko (– Nikolay Musiyenko; born 16 December 1959) is a Ukrainian former triple jumper who represented the Soviet Union and later Ukraine. He won four medals for the Soviet Union at the European Indoor Championships, being the champion in both 1983 and 1989. He competed at the 1989 IAAF World Indoor Championships, but failed to record a valid mark in the final. He was also a finalist at the 1986 European Athletics Championships. He was a bronze medallist at the 1986 Goodwill Games, held on home soil in Moscow.

This mark is a former European record and made him the fourth best jumper ever at the time (after Willie Banks, João Carlos de Oliveira and Charles Simpkins). The European mark was beaten later that year by Bulgarian Khristo Markov and it remained the Soviet national record until 1990, when it was beaten by Vladimir Inozemtsev. As of January 2017, Musiyenko remains second on the Ukrainian lists after Inozemtsev and within the twenty best outdoor triple jumpers on the all-time lists.

He was twice national champion at the Soviet Indoor Athletics Championships, taking the title in 1982 and 1986 – both with meet record performances. At the Soviet Athletics Championships outdoors, his best finish was third, which he achieved at the 1981 and 1987 meets.

International competitions

See also
List of European Athletics Indoor Championships medalists (men)

References

External links

1959 births
Living people
Soviet male triple jumpers
Ukrainian male triple jumpers
Goodwill Games medalists in athletics
Competitors at the 1986 Goodwill Games